Sir Haare Mahanga Te Wehinga Williams  is a New Zealand educator, broadcaster and writer. He is described as a pioneer in Māori broadcasting, credited for his role in establishing a joint venture between Aotearoa Radio and the South Seas Film and Television School.

In the 2018 New Year Honours, Williams was appointed a Member of the New Zealand Order of Merit, for services to Māori, the arts and education. He was promoted to Knight Companion of the New Zealand Order of Merit, for services to Māori, literature and education, in the 2023 New Year Honours.

References

Living people
New Zealand Māori people
Knights Companion of the New Zealand Order of Merit
New Zealand justices of the peace
Year of birth missing (living people)